Scaphella robusta marionae is a subspecies of sea snail, a marine gastropod mollusc in the family Volutidae, the votules.

Description

Distribution

References

 Coltro J. (1998). Siratus 3 (14) : 3-8

External links
 Pilsbry, H. A. & Olsson, A. A. (1953). Materials for a revision of East Coast and Floridan Volutes. The Nautilus. 67 (1): 1-13

Volutidae
Gastropods described in 1953